John Andrews (born May 1, 1944) is an American conservative activist and Republican politician in Colorado, United States, having served as state senator from 1998 to 2005 and Senate President in 2003-2005.  Andrews has also served at the national level as a presidential speechwriter for Richard Nixon, making the only public protest resignation from the White House staff during Watergate; as an education appointee by President Ronald Reagan; and on a foreign scholarships commission for President George W. Bush. He was the Republican nominee for Governor of Colorado in 1990, founder and president of the Independence Institute, chairman of the State Policy Network, the director of TCI Cable News, and the original host of Backbone Radio.

From 2009 until his retirement in 2015, Andrews was director of Centennial Institute.

A familiar voice in Colorado TV, radio, and newspaper commentary since the 1980s, he is also the author of Responsibility Reborn: A Citizen's Guide to the Next American Century (Denali Press, 2011) and Backbone Colorado USA: Dispatches from the Divide (CreateSpace, 2015). He previously served as editor of Imprimis at Hillsdale College, was a senior executive with two Christian ministries, and participated as a member of the adjunct faculty in public policy at the Colorado School of Mines for 18 years.

Personal life 

Andrews was born in Michigan and grew up in the Colorado mountains, taking most of his K-12 schooling in St. Louis, Missouri.  He served as a US Navy submarine officer after graduating from Principia College in 1966. His wife since 1967 has been the former Donna D'Evelyn of Bakersfield, California. They have three grown children and a grandson, all living in the Denver area.

Legislative achievements 

As a state senator from 1998 to 2005, Andrews served as minority leader 2001-2003. After leading the GOP back to majority control, he was elected as Senate President for 2003-2005. During his tenure, he helped pass bills establishing education vouchers, expanding charter schools, extending tort reform, cutting the capital gains tax, reducing union control of state employees, requiring parental notification when a minor seeks an abortion, and restoring the Pledge of Allegiance in classrooms.

He was honored as National Legislator of the Year by the American Legislative Exchange Council (ALEC) and as Family Legislator of the Year by the Rocky Mountain Family Council. The Colorado Union of Taxpayers saluted him as a defender of TABOR, the state's tax limit.

Andrews' legislative achievements also included bills cutting the capital gains tax, curbing the matricula ID card for illegal immigrants, providing toll lanes to reduce traffic congestion, outlining a statewide water policy, and drawing permanent congressional districts.  He put into law the School Sunshine Act to keep teacher unions accountable and the Read to Achieve program for school improvement.

Centennial Institute 

From 2009 until his retirement in 2015, Andrews was director of Centennial Institute, which sponsors events, publications, and research in public policy areas.  In proclaiming "liberty throughout the land," its aim is to help Colorado Christian University (CCU) teach citizenship and to help Americans renew the spirit of 1776. The Institute was founded in 2009 by Andrews and former US Senator William Armstrong, late president of CCU. Through the Centennial Institute, Andrews help establish the Western Conservative Summit, which has been held every year since 2010 in Denver.

Accusations of Islamophobia 

During an address to the Western Conservative Summit on July 12, 2019, Andrews delivered a series of talking points that many viewed as full of Islamophobic tropes. He claimed that organizations like the Muslim Brotherhood and the Council on American-Islamic Relations were engaging in "civilizational jihad" and trying to move the United States to a Sharia Law based system. He also made the claim that Muslim values are inherently antithetical to American values, saying "They will tell you that a good and faithful Muslim can also be a good and faithful American. Sorry, but I don’t see how", as well as stating that the United States was engaged in a "war to the death" with two intrinsic enemies, "The name of one is Marx. The name of the other is Mohammed.", referring to Communism and the Islamic faith.

Krista Cole, a Muslim and vice-chair of the Colorado chapter of the Council on American-Islamic Relations, denounced his speech as Islamophobic, stating, "He was given a loud voice. He was comfortable enough with his Islamophobic speech that he just spewed it out in public". She drew significant parallels between how the rhetoric of contemporary politicians in the United States regarding Muslims and that of the German Nazis of the 1930s, saying "Germany was also concerned with these laws of Jews, thinking that Jews were trying to undermine them at every turn, convinced that there was some underhanded conspiracy. Anti-semitism and Islamophobia are cousins. Same family." Andrews' statement and her response came at a time when the United States has seen a marked increase in hate crimes, a disproportionate number of which target Muslim Americans.

Cole and the larger organization of the Council on American-Islamic Relations called for prominent political figures in attendance, including Colorado Senator Cory Gardner, Housing and Urban Development Secretary Ben Carson, and Donald Trump Jr., to condemn the speech.

References

Sources

External links
 

|-

|-

1944 births
Living people
Republican Party Colorado state senators
Principia College alumni
People from Allegan, Michigan